The white-throated quail-dove (Zentrygon frenata) is a species of bird in the family Columbidae. It is found in Argentina, Bolivia, Colombia, Ecuador, and Peru.

Taxonomy and systematics

The white-throated quail-dove's taxonomic history is complicated. It was originally described in genus Geotrygon, later erroneously given the binomial Oreopeleia bourcieri, and still later attained its present binomial. The four subspecies below are currently recognized. Z. f. boucieri was at one time treated as separate species by some authors. Additional subspecies have been proposed but are now generally accepted as color morphs or individual variations of one of the four accepted subspecies.

The four subspecies of white-throated quail-dove are the nominate Z. f. frenata, Z. f. bourcieri, Z. f. subgrisea, and Z. f. margaritae.

Description

The adult nominate male's forehead and the lower part of the face are buff and the crown blue-gray. The mantle is deep purple and the rest of the upperparts reddish brown. The throat is white, the breast gray, and the belly and flanks dark buff. Females are browner rather than gray; juveniles are similar to the female with the addition of dark barring on both the upper and underparts. The other subspecies differ somewhat in the colors of their heads.

Distribution and habitat

The subspecies of white-throated quail-dove are found from north to south thus:

 Z. f. bourcieri - western Colombia and western and eastern Ecuador
 Z. f. subgrisea - southwestern Ecuador and northwestern Peru
 Z. f. frenata - northern Peru to central Bolivia
 Z. f. margaritae - southern Bolivia and far northwestern Argentina

Behavior

Feeding

The white-throated quail-dove forages on the ground, usually alone but sometimes with one or two other birds. Its diet has not been documented.

Breeding

The white-throated quail-dove's breeding season appears to vary across its range. Essentially nothing else is known about its breeding phenology.

Vocalization

The white-throated quail-dove's song is "a single monotonous low-pitched note whoOOo, with highest amplitude in the middle."

Status

The IUCN has assessed the white-throated quail-dove as being of Least Concern. Its population is suspected to be stable but has not been quantified. Little is known about its biology and ecology and it appears to be patchily distributed.

References

white-throated quail-dove
Birds of the Northern Andes
white-throated quail-dove
Taxonomy articles created by Polbot